Bernard McConville (October 16, 1887 – December 27, 1961) was an American screenwriter. He wrote for more than 90 films between 1915 and 1946. He was born in Denver, Colorado and died in Los Angeles County, California.

Partial filmography

 Gretchen the Greenhorn (1916)
 The Little School Ma'am (1916)
 The Rose of Blood (1917)
 The Babes in the Woods (1917)
 The Deciding Kiss (1918)
 Rosemary Climbs the Heights (1918)
 That Devil, Bateese (1918)
 Bare Fists (1919)
 The Sleeping Lion (1919)
 What Women Love (1920)
 45 Minutes from Broadway (1920)
 A Connecticut Yankee in King Arthur's Court (1921)
 Shame (1921)
 Little Lord Fauntleroy (1921)
 Without Compromise (1922)
 Stepping Fast (1923)
 Crinoline and Romance (1923)
 Wings of Youth (1925)
 The Phantom of the Opera (1925)
 Volcano! (1926)
 Cannonball Express (1932)
 King of the Pecos (1936)
 The Lonely Trail (1936)
 I Cover the War (1937)
 Overland Stage Raiders (1938)
 Arizona Legion (1939)

External links

1887 births
1961 deaths
American male screenwriters
Writers from Denver
Screenwriters from Colorado
20th-century American male writers
20th-century American screenwriters